A saddle valve is a valve used to supply liquid where a low volume, low pressure stream is required. The name is derived from the fact that it is mounted in such a way that it "saddles" the line, mounting it from both sides.

They are typically used for supplying cold water, via a 3/8 inch tube, to:
 humidifiers and
 icemakers in freezers.

A saddle valve is mounted directly on to a pipe which is usually 1/2 inch copper tubing.  Saddle valves are self-tapping devices. Once mounted on a line, with the included rubber seal in place, all that is required is to turn the valve clockwise until it pierces the water line. When the valve handle can no longer be turned, it is done tapping the pipe. Turning the handle counter-clockwise opens the valve. These valves can be installed without shutting off the main water supply.

Plumbing codes, local or international, often do not allow use of a saddle valve; instead a tee and a conventional globe, gate, or ball valve is to be installed.

See also
Valve
Plumbing

Valves